Parthenope (minor planet designation: 11 Parthenope) is a large, bright main-belt asteroid.

Parthenope was discovered by Annibale de Gasparis on 11 May 1850, the second of his nine asteroid discoveries. It was named after Parthenopē, one of the Sirens in Greek mythology, said to have founded the city of Naples. De Gasparis "used his utmost endeavours to realise a 'Parthenope' in the heavens, such being the name suggested by Sir John Herschel on the occasion of the discovery of Hygiea in 1849". Two symbols were proposed for Parthenope: a fish and a star and later a lyre. Both are obsolete.

There have been two observed Parthenopian occultations, on 13 February 1987, and 28 April 2006.

On 6 August 2008, during a perihelic opposition, Parthenope had an apparent magnitude of 8.8.

In 1988 a search for satellites or dust orbiting this asteroid was performed using the UH88 telescope at the Mauna Kea Observatories, but the effort came up empty.

Based upon a light curve that was generated from photometric observations of this asteroid at Pulkovo Observatory, it has a rotation period of 13.722 ± 0.001 hours and varies in brightness by 0.10 ± 0.0s in magnitude. The light curve displays three maxima and minima per cycle. The JPL Small-Body Database lists a rotation period of 13.7204 hours.

Mass
In 2007, Baer and Chesley calculated a higher mass and density for Parthenope based on perturbations by the 90 km asteroid 17 Thetis.  Baer and Chesley calculated a mass of 6.3 kg with a density of 3.3 g/cm3. 2008 estimates by Baer suggest a mass of 6.15. The 1997 and 2001 estimates by Viateau and Rapaport were closer to 5 kg with a density of 2.7 g/cm3.

See also
 Former classification of planets

Notes

External links 
 Lightcurve plot of 11 Parthenope, Palmer Divide Observatory, B. D. Warner (2008)
 IOTA (International Occultation Timing Association) occultation database
 2011-Jan-26 Occultation / (2011 Asteroidal Occultation Results for North America)
 
 

000011
Discoveries by Annibale de Gasparis
Named minor planets
000011
000011
18500511